Attila Simon (born 22 March 1939) is a Hungarian middle-distance runner. He competed in the men's 1500 metres at the 1964 Summer Olympics.

References

1939 births
Living people
Athletes (track and field) at the 1960 Summer Olympics
Athletes (track and field) at the 1964 Summer Olympics
Hungarian male middle-distance runners
Hungarian male steeplechase runners
Olympic athletes of Hungary
Place of birth missing (living people)
20th-century Hungarian people